Sinead Emily Miller (born June 9, 1990) is an American elite racing cyclist and winner of the 2009 Collegiate Cycling National Criterium Championship. She considers herself to be an "all-arounder"  and hoped to qualify for the 2012 Olympic Games.

Cycling experience
Miller began racing BMX bicycles at age five.  She competed at the highest levels in BMX and was part of several professional teams.  During most of Miller 's racing years she was a part of HYPER Bicycles Factory BMX team.

To cross train for BMX, Miller began training on road bicycles at age ten and began to race on the road at age 11.  She won her first road cycling national championship title at age 14.  As her cycling career progressed, she won numerous national titles and also was selected to compete at the Junior Road World Championships at ages 17 and 18.  In 2008, Miller placed eighth at the Junior Road World Championships in Cape Town, South Africa.

Miller joined the U.S. National Team at age 18.  She raced for the team in Italy, France, Poland, Czech Republic, Austria, South Africa, Netherlands, Belgium and Mexico.

Miller raced collegiality for Marian University's cycling team.  In 2008–2009, Miller won collegiate track national championships and also collegiate road criterium national championships.  She was the first female cyclist from Marian to win a collegiate road national championship.

Because of Miller's performance and final results in the omnium ranking at the collegiate road nationals in Fort Collins, Colorado in March 2009, she was named a "Collegiate All-Star" and selected for the all-collegiate-women's team that would compete in the Nature Valley Grand Prix later that season. She is also a past winner of the International Tour de Toona.

Palmares
July 2–11, 2010, Giro Donne, Italy

June 27, 2010, U23 US Road National Championships, Bend, Oregon
1st Place

June 24, 2010, U23 US National Time Trial Championships, Bend, Oregon
1st place

June 6, 2010, TD Bank Philadelphia International Cycling Championship, Philadelphia, Pennsylvania
1st Place in Best Young Rider Category

May 9, 2010, Collegiate Road National Championships, Madison, Wisconsin
1st place- Division 1 Team Omnium

April 5, 2010, GP de Dottignies, Belgium, UCI 1.2
20th Place

April 4, 2010, Ronde Van Vlaanderen, Belgium, UCI World Cup

March 28, 2010, Trofeo Alfredo Binda - Comune di Cittiglio, Italy, UCI World Cup
18th Place

May 9, 2009, Collegiate Road National Championships, Fort Collins, CO
1st place- Women’s Division 1 Criterium

April 7 – May 5, 2009, Raced with U.S. Women’s National Team throughout Europe
1st place- Challenge Alienor - in Bordeaux, France
3rd place- Women’s road race in Agen, France

September 11–13, 2008, Collegiate Track National Championships
1st- Women’s Team Pursuit
1st- Collegiate Team Pursuit
1st- Women’s Points Race
3rd- Women’s 2 Kilometer Time Trial

September 6–9, 2008, Junior National Championships, Orange County, CA 
1st Place - Junior Women’s 17-18 Criterium

July 20, 2008, Junior World Championships, Cape Town, South Africa 
8th –Women’s Road Race

July 10–13, 2008, Raced UCI 2.2 Krasna Lipa Stage Race, Czech Republic

July 3–14, 2008, Attended training camp with Women’s U.S. National Team in Lucca, Italy

June 15, 2008, Junior World Championships Selection Road Race, Red River Gorge, Kentucky 
1st place - Junior Women 17-18

April 26–27, 2008, Tour de Ephrata, Ephrata, PA
1st- Road Race Women’s Pro 1/2/3
1st- Criterium Women’s Pro 1/2/3
2nd – Time Trial Women’s Pro 1/2/3
1st – Overall GC Women’s Pro 1/2/3

March 3, 2008, Arnold Classic Criterium, Columbus, OH 
1st Place - Women’s Pro 1/2/3

2007, Junior National Championships, Seven Springs, Pennsylvania
1st Place- Junior Women’s 17-18 Criterium

2007, Raced Junior World Road Race and Time Trial Championships, Mexico

2004, Junior National Championships, Salt Lake City, Utah
1st Place- Junior Women’s 14-15 Criterium

Other
Sinead Miller is currently a senior at Marian University in Indianapolis, Indiana.  At school Sinead majors in chemistry and mathematics with a concentration in rhetoric.  She is also involved in an independent study with the chemistry department at Marian University.  Sinead has started her sophomore year of college in the fall of 2009 and she hopes to attend medical school after receiving her bachelor's degree from Marian University.

References

External links
 
 
 
 https://web.archive.org/web/20100515111548/http://teamtwenty12.com/bio_miller.htm
 https://web.archive.org/web/20110103130032/http://pghracing.org/2010/01/29/interview-sinead-miller/
 https://web.archive.org/web/20110714160135/http://triablog.naturevalleybicyclefestival.com/2010/04/sinead-miller-ryan-alumae-and-usa-cyclist/
 http://www.post-gazette.com/pg/09211/987307-55.stm
 https://web.archive.org/web/20110719165718/http://www.womenscycling.net/2010/Gallery2010/04_Dottingnies/pages/page22.html
 Facebook Profile
 Marian University Profile
 http://www.cyclingnews.com/races/trofeo-alfredo-binda-comune-di-cittiglio-cdm/results

1990 births
Living people
American female cyclists
Marian University (Indiana) people
21st-century American women